The 1911 Coupe de Chamonix was the third edition of the Coupe de Chamonix, an international ice hockey tournament. It was held from January 16-19, 1911, in Chamonix, France. The Oxford Canadians won the tournament.

Results

Final Table

External links
 Tournament on hockeyarchives.info

Coupe de Chamonix
Chamonix
Chamonix